BSAT-2b, was a geostationary communications satellite ordered by B-SAT which was designed and manufactured by Orbital Sciences Corporation on the STAR-1 platform. It was designed to be stationed on the 110° East orbital slot along its companion BSAT-2a where it would provide redundant high definition direct television broadcasting across Japan.

But the Ariane 5G rocket had an anomaly during its July 12, 2001 launch. It left BSAT-2b stranded in an orbit too low for its propulsion system to compensate and the spacecraft was written off. BSAT ordered BSAT-2c immediately to replace it. It decayed and burned in the atmosphere on January 28, 2014.

Satellite description
BSAT-2b was designed and manufactured by Orbital Sciences Corporation on the STAR-1 satellite bus for B-SAT. As all four STAR-1 satellites, it had a solid rocket Star 30CBP apogee kick motor for orbit raising, plus  of propellant for its liquid propellant station keeping thrusters.

It measured  when stowed for launch. Its dual wing solar panels can generate 2.6 kW of power at the beginning of its design life, and span  when fully deployed.

It has a single Ku band payload with four active transponders plus four spares with a TWTA output power of 130 Watts.

History
In March 1999, B-SAT ordered from Orbital Sciences Corporation two satellites based on the STAR-1 platform: BSAT-2a and BSAT-2b. This was the second order of the bus and the first since Orbital had acquired CTA Space Systems, the original developer.

BSAT-2b was launched aboard an Ariane 5G at 23:58 UTC, July 12, 2001, from Guiana Space Center ELA-3. It rode on the lower berth below Artemis. But the EPS upper stage had an anomaly and left the satellites on a 17,528 km × 592 km × 2.9° orbit, short of the planned 35,853 km × 858 km × 2.0°. While Artemis used its electric propulsion to make up for the difference. But BSAT-2b Star 30CBP apogee kick motor could not make up for the orbital energy short fall and was written off.

On January 28, 2014, BSAT-2b decayed from its orbit and burned in the atmosphere.

References

Communications satellites in geostationary orbit
Satellites using the GEOStar bus
Spacecraft launched in 2001
Satellite launch failures
Communications satellites of Japan
Satellites of Japan